Maria Baldó i Massanet (July 2, 1884 - February 17, 1964) was a Spanish pedagogue, feminist, ethnologist, and folklorist. She was involved in the political, social, cultural, and educational fields of Catalonia.

Biography
She was a daughter of Santiago Baldó i Domènech and Maria Mansanet (or Massanet) i Santacreu. She came to live in Catalonia as a child.

From her first marriage with Josep Serra Chartó (died 1911), her son, was born in 1909.

Baldo wrote for several periodicals, such as La Veu de Catalunya, Una védade, Art jove, Companya, Portantveu del Club Femení i d’esports de Barcelona, La Dona Catalana, and while in French exile, Tramontane.

She stood out among the women who shaped the first Catalan feminist movement at the beginning of the 20th century. On April 28, 1912, she published the article  (About female school education) in the women's magazine Feminal. In 1933, she published El libro del hogar (The home book), which was republished on several occasions. In 1916, she took part in conferences on women's education, also at Ateneu, alongside other speakers such as Carmen Karr, Leonor Serrano, and Dolors Monserdà.

As a teacher, her career was closely linked to the La Farigola de Vallcarca school (currently, Escola La Farigola de Vallcarca). Likewise, she was part of the committee that selected the teachers. In those months, she assumed the role of Dean of Teachers in Barcelona. Baldó also acted as a free assistant teacher at the Escola Normal de Barcelona.

Baldo spoke at many conferences, also radio broadcasts. The most common themes were literature, children's games, and women's education. She called for the creation of specialized schools for the training of women and for the preparation for motherhood. In 1933, she assumed the secretariat of the executive committee of the Social Education Congress. That same year, she became part of the executive committee of the Organizing Committee of the Left Women's Day. She also signed the Manifesto to the women of Catalonia, in July 1934, and, the following year, the intellectual Manifesto in favor of freedom, against fascism, and in favor of the creation of the Action Front for Defense of Culture. She assumed the presidency of the Lyceum Club of Barcelona in 1936, and the vice presidency of the executive committee of the Union of Women of Catalonia. She was part of the Second New Unified School Council. At the proposal of this body, she chaired the Adaptation Commission of the teaching staff of the Generalitat's technical bodies to the needs of the war. She was also general secretary of La Dona a la Reraguarda, section of the Propaganda Commissariat of the Generalitat de Catalunya.

Baldó was a supporter of Republicanism in Spain. She was a member of and an activist for the Republican Left of Catalonia. At the end of the Civil War, in 1939, Baldó went into exile in Toulouse, France, with her second husband, Lluís Torres Ullastres.

Death and legacy
Maria Baldó died in Toulouse, France, 1964.

In the vicinity of La Farigola school, there are gardens that bear her name.

Selected works
 El libro del hogar, 1933

References

1884 births
1964 deaths
People from Hellín
20th-century Spanish educators
Spanish feminists
Spanish folklorists
Exiles of the Spanish Civil War in France